Hunting Party or Hubertus Hunt is a 1959 West German drama film directed by Hermann Kugelstadt and starring Wolf Albach-Retty, Willy Fritsch and Lucie Englisch. It is part of the tradition of heimatfilm which were at their commercial peak during the decade. Its German title is a reference to the traditional Hubertus Day hunts commemorating the life of St. Hubert of Liege.

Cast
 Wolf Albach-Retty as Friedrich Dahlhoff
 Elke Andrend as Irene
 Lucie Englisch as Gretl
 Helmut Fischer as Erwin
 Willy Fritsch as Otto Lindenberg
 Sascha Hehn as Peterle
 Sylvia Lydi as Charlotte
 Angelika Meissner as Monika Dahlhoff
 Raidar Müller-Elmau as Jörg
 Robert Naegele as Thomas Faber
 Margitta Scherr as Christa Faber
 Viktor Staal as Jakob Reinhard
 Peter Thom as Mathias Reinhard

References

Bibliography 
 Bock, Hans-Michael & Bergfelder, Tim. The Concise CineGraph. Encyclopedia of German Cinema. Berghahn Books, 2009.

External links 
 

1959 films
1959 drama films
German drama films
West German films
1950s German-language films
Films directed by Hermann Kugelstadt
Films about horses
1950s German films